Ryusei Furukawa (10 June 1893 – 23 May 1968) was a Japanese painter. His work was part of the painting event in the art competition at the 1932 Summer Olympics.

References

1893 births
1968 deaths
20th-century Japanese painters
Japanese painters
Olympic competitors in art competitions
People from Tochigi Prefecture